Pseudafreutreta bicolor is a species of tephritid or fruit flies in the genus Pseudafreutreta of the family Tephritidae.

Distribution
Uganda.

References

Tephritinae
Insects described in 1957
Diptera of Africa